"Hallo Hallo" is the third single from Ace of Base's greatest hits record Singles of the 90s.  The song was released in 2000 in Germany, Spain, and Scandinavia. The song was also featured on their greatest hits: Greatest Hits (2008 Ace of Base album),  and 2019’s Ace of Base Gold compilation album.

The song appeared in the American Adam Sandler film You Don't Mess with the Zohan.

Background
The song was originally recorded with lead vocals by Jonas for Cruel Summer / Flowers. According to Jonas, "it wasn't ready in time."  The song was re-recorded with Jenny and Linn on lead vocals for Singles of the 90s. The Hitvision Remix of Hallo Hallo was meant to be a single from Greatest Hits with yet again re-recorded vocals, this time with Jenny almost completely taking over lead vocal duties. A sample of the song appeared on the band's American web page, retitled Hello Hello, yet the inclusion and single release was canceled when Arista head Clive Davis insisted that "Everytime It Rains" be remixed and released instead.

Tracklistings
Scandinavia

CD Single
 Hallo Hallo (Radio Version)
 Hallo Hallo (Hitvision Radio Edit)

CD Maxi/German Maxi
 Hallo Hallo (Radio Version)
 Hallo Hallo (Hitvision Radio Edit)
 Hallo Hallo (Original Version)
 Hallo Hallo (Dub)

Spain

CD Maxi
 Hallo Hallo (Xtm Full Remix)
 Hallo Hallo (Xtm Dub Remix)
 Hallo Hallo (Xtm Radio Remix)
 Hallo Hallo (Hitvision Radio Edit)

Official Versions/Remixes
Album Version
Radio Version
Hitvision Radio Edit
XTM Radio Remix
XTM Full Remix
XTM Dub Remix
Dub

Release history

Charts

Ace of Base songs
2000 singles
Songs written by Jonas Berggren
2000 songs
Mega Records singles